The Jerusalem Open House for Pride and Tolerance (JOH,  HaBayit HaPatuach, "Open House";  Al-Beit Al-Maftoukh) is a nonprofit organization, founded in 1997, with a community center serving people of all sexual orientations and gender identities. While reaching out with its message of equality and acceptance to all people in Jerusalem and abroad, its main focuses are community building, providing humanitarian services and promoting social change. It works to create a safe, pluralistic and egalitarian Jerusalem that is welcoming to all of its inhabitants, communities and visitors, regardless of sexual orientation or gender identity.

Activities
The Jerusalem Open House was founded in 1997. Since then, it has been an essential pillar in the queer community of Jerusalem. JOH founded the first LGBT health clinic in Israel – the Open Clinic – and now also offers subsidized counseling through the Open Counseling. The open house includes many different group meetings, as well as a comprehensive youth. Additionally, the JOH annual Jerusalem Pride marches organized by the center have become the largest human-rights demonstrations in Jerusalem, and has been put on annually since 2002. In 2006, the JOH hosted WorldPride.

The Community Center 
The Jerusalem Open House in the only LQBTQ community center in Jerusalem and its greater area. It is open daily from 12pm-4pm for anyone seeking out a safe space. There are sitting areas, a kitchen and a library. In this same space, many of the educational groups meet. In total, there are over 20 social groups at JOH, each coordinated by a trained volunteer. Community members also gather in the JOH for special events, joint holidays, activities, workshops, poetry nights and lectures.

The JOH offers ongoing community celebrations, mostly around holidays. The center also organizes meetings and events for people of all religious denominations, including a social group for Orthodox gay men. In addition, JOH supports exchanges with LGBT synagogues abroad.

JOH has also hosted family friendly gatherings for Purim.

Education 
JOH offers services specifically for youth living in the area around Jerusalem, including doing outreach in schools. Beyond youth groups, there are adult groups including a group of English speakers, Arabic speakers, senior women, and senior men.

The Jerusalem Open House runs the program "More le Haim" which was founded in the memory of Shira Banki, after the hate crimes at the annual Jerusalem March for Pride and Tolerance in 2015, which resulted in her death. Our education team and volunteers conduct educational seminars around the city, reaching thousands of school pupils, teachers and counsellors, soldiers and civic organizations in Jerusalem. The mission of the program is to educate and to create a more tolerant, welcoming and aware environment for LGBTQ youth. The program includes 170 presentations annually and is rooted in the concept of engendering empathy through personal narratives and conversation about LGBTQ related issues.

Health services
In 2008, JOH opened a clinic which offers anonymous HIV testing and counseling to anyone. The clinic can also prescribe post-exposure prophylaxis (PEP), and pre-exposure prophylaxis (PrEP).

Additionally, the JOH provides low cost counseling through its Open Counseling Services. Open Counseling is a psycho-social service unit with a team of 12 therapists and social workers who offer individual, family, and group treatments at subsidized prices and in a safe, accepting environment. JOH also provides social workers who are able to guide and support LGBTQ at-risk youth and teenagers day-to-day and in emergency situations. The Open Counseling professional staff provides training, workshops and seminars on LGBTQ and therapy related issues and works to improve the wellbeing of Jerusalem's LGBTQ community.

Advocacy
The JOH takes action on a variety of issues concerning the LGBT community through campaigning and advocacy. Current campaigns include efforts to convince the Rabbinical School of the Conservative movement to accept LGBT people into its Rabbinical program in Israel; to achieve recognition for LGBT victims of the Holocaust and their inclusion in Israel's national Holocaust memorial ceremonies; and to protest against conversion therapy.

Jerusalem March for Pride and Tolerance

In 2002, JOH sued the city of Jerusalem for not allowing them to have a pride parade. The JOH won this case, and the city of Jerusalem paid the group the equivalent of 10,000 USD in settlement. Since, the JOH has organized the annual pride parades in Jerusalem under the name "Jerusalem March for Pride and Tolerance."

In 2005, a municipal ban attempted to halt the parade, but it was overturned by a district court order. Protesters, many of them religious Jews, lined the mile-long parade route shouting insults and displaying signs with messages like: "You are corrupting our children," and "Jerusalem is not San Francisco." During the parade, Yishai Schlissel, a Haredi Jew, stabbed three parade participants with a kitchen knife. During a police interrogation, he described the motive behind his actions: "I came to murder on behalf of God. We can't have such abomination in the country." The perpetrator was subsequently convicted of three counts of attempted murder and sentenced to 12 years in prison. The Jerusalem District Court also ordered that NIS 280 million (about US$60 million) be paid as compensation to the victims. Schlissel was released in 2015 and returned to the Pride Parade in 2015 to attack again.

The 2006 Pride parade was also steeped in controversy. Radical right-wing activists Hillel Weiss, Baruch Marzel and Itamar Ben-Gvir declared a "holy war" against those participating in the Parade and announced that unless the parade was cancelled, violence would ensue. The Parade's coordinators filed a complaint, accusing them of incitement to murder. A week before the parade violent rioting broke out in the Haredi neighborhood of Mea Shearim. Seven policemen and a number of unknown protesters were wounded. However, the parade proceeded without incident.

In 2015, six people were stabbed at the parade by Schlissel, the same perpetrator of the 2005 stabbing. This stabbing resulted in the death of Shira Banki, who was 16 years old. Schlissel has since been sentenced to life in prison for six counts of attempted murder.

Despite threats, violence and challenges from conservative parties and aggressors, the  March for Pride and Tolerance continues to be put on each year. As the city's largest human rights event, involving many thousands of marchers, the Pride March enables participants to shape the contemporary face of Jerusalem and publicly support LGBTQ people's struggle for full rights, and life without prejudice in their city. Prior to the Pride March, the month of July is filled with daily events, lectures, workshops and parties celebrating Pride and Tolerance in Jerusalem.

Controversy 
The JOH has been involved in some controversy, both within Israel and in the United States.

In 2014, the JOH was erroneously linked to the killing of Muhammad Abu Khdeir. There was a rumor that Khdeir had been a member of JOH and that was the reason for his murder. JOH claimed that this was not true and the group reiterated that they want peace between Israelis and Palestinians. The group has had Palestinian members since 2001, although Palestinians have been forming their own groups since around 2007.

In 2016, a Shabbat service planned by A Wider Bridge and in which JOH participated as part of the National LGBTQ Task Force's Creating Change Conference was first cancelled, then un-cancelled, and finally protested against by anti-Israeli protesters in Chicago. Protestors accused the groups of pinkwashing and physically disrupted a presentation that JOH members were giving about the attack at the 2015 Jerusalem March for Pride and Tolerance.

See also
 Havruta, split off from JOH in 2010
 Al Qaws, split off from JOH in 2007
 Tehila

References

External links 
 Jerusalem Open House
 Jerusalem Open House Blog

LGBT culture in Jerusalem
LGBT organizations in Israel
1997 establishments in Israel
Organizations established in 1997
Organizations based in Jerusalem